Nílton dos Santos (16 May 1925 – 27 November 2013) was a Brazilian footballer who primarily played as a wingback. At international level, he was a member of the Brazil squads that won the 1958 and 1962 World Cups.

Regarded as one of the greatest defenders in the history of the game, Nílton Santos is a member of the World Team of the 20th Century, and was named by Pelé one of the top 125 greatest living footballers at a FIFA Awards ceremony in 2004. In 2009, he was the recipient of the Golden Foot Legends Award. He was unrelated to his frequent defensive partner Djalma Santos.

Club career
Born in Rio de Janeiro, he was a pioneering attacking left back, being one of the first full backs to make runs down the wing to participate in the offensive game. Once he said: "I have never envied today's players the money but the freedom they have, to go forward".
He played all his professional club career for Botafogo de Futebol e Regatas.

He was called "The Encyclopedia" because of his knowledge of the sport of football. He was world class both at defending and attacking and possessed very good technique.

International career
Nílton was a key player in defence during the 1954, 1958 and 1962 World Cup finals (he was also in the Brazilian squad for the 1950 finals, but made no appearances) and became famous for scoring a goal in the 1958 tournament when Brazil played Austria. Dribbling his way through the whole field, he finished with a shot that drove his coach Vicente Feola crazy (he kept on insisting for Nílton to retreat to the defensive field, but was ignored until the goal was scored).

Nílton Santos played for only two teams in his professional career; Botafogo de Futebol e Regatas and the Brazil national team collecting 75 caps and scoring 3 goals.

Death
Santos died of a lung infection on 27 November 2013, aged 88, in Rio de Janeiro. He was not only the last surviving member of the Brazil 1950 FIFA World Cup squad, but also the fourth 1958 World Cup champion to die in a few months, after Djalma Santos died in July 2013, Gilmar and De Sordi both in August 2013 and all of them within a year of the 2014 FIFA World Cup in their native Brazil.

Legacy
Botafogo de Futebol e Regatas's home, and 2016 Summer Olympics host stadium, the Estádio Olímpico Nílton Santos, also called Engenhão, is named after him.

Honours
Botafogo
Campeonato Carioca: 1948, 1957, 1961, 1962
Torneio Rio – São Paulo 1962, 1964

Brazil
FIFA World Cup: 1958, 1962
South American Championship: 1949
Panamerican Championship: 1952
Taça do Atlântico: 1956, 1960
Copa Rio Branco: 1950
Taça Oswaldo Cruz: 1950, 1955, 1956, 1958, 1961, 1962
Taça Bernado O'Higgins: 1955, 1961

Individual
FIFA World Cup All-Star Team: 1958
World Soccer World XI: 1960, 1961
World Team of the 20th Century: 1998
FIFA 100: 2004
Golden Foot: 2009, as a football legend
IFFHS Brazilian Player of the 20th Century (9th place)
The Best of The Best – Player of the Century: Top 50
Brazilian Football Museum Hall of Fame

See also 
 List of one-club men in association football
 History of Botafogo de Futebol e Regatas

References

External links

 
 Official website proving that "Reis" added to his name is an error 

Profile 
Nilton Reis dos Santos - International Appearances

1925 births
2013 deaths
Footballers from Rio de Janeiro (city)
Brazilian footballers
Botafogo de Futebol e Regatas players
Association football defenders
FIFA 100
1950 FIFA World Cup players
1954 FIFA World Cup players
1958 FIFA World Cup players
1962 FIFA World Cup players
FIFA World Cup-winning players
Brazil international footballers